Candylion is the second solo album by Welsh musician and Super Furry Animals front-man Gruff Rhys. It was released on 8 January 2007 through Rough Trade Records (in the UK) and Team Love (in the US) and peaked at number fifty on the UK Albums Chart. The album includes the singles "Candylion" and "Gyrru Gyrru Gyrru".

It also features Lisa Jen from the Welsh language band 9Bach on backing vocals and xylophone. On its release, record stores stocking the album were supplied with 96 inch cardboard sheets with patterns for making the cardboard candylion seen on the album cover, to hand out to purchasers.

Track listing
All music and beats by Gruff Rhys.

Personnel

Musician Credits
Gruff Rhys – Music and Beats
Lisa Jên – Extra Vocals (2, 4, 6 to 8, 10, 12)
Owen Evans – Double Bass (2 to 6, 10, 12)
Kassin – Gameboy Beats (9)
Gorwel Owen – Tamboura (7), Stylophone (12)
Marçal – Extra Special Production (8, 9, 12)
Tandi Gebara – Birambau (12)
Felipe Pinaud – Flute (5, 11, 12)
Jonathan Thomas – Pedal Steel (6)
Rhodri Puw – Bell (4)
Siwan Puw – Sleigh Bells (7)
Samantha Caldato – Intro Vocal (1), Air Steward Vocal (12)

Technical credits
Gruff Rhys, Gorwel Owen and Mario Caldato, Jr. – Producer
Gorwel Owen – Recording (at Stiwsio Ofn, Llanfaelog, Wales)
Mario Caldato, Jr. – Mixing and Extra Special Percussion Recording (at AR Studio 3, Rio de Janeiro, Brasil)
Igor Ferreira and Cesar Miranda – Mixing Assistant (at AR Studio 3, Rio de Janeiro, Brasil)
Stewart Hawkes – Mastering (at Metropolis, London)
Sean O'Hagan and Marcus Haldaway – String Arrangements (at Dairy, Brixton, London)
Marc Lane – Engineering (at Dairy, Brixton, London)
Amanda Britton, Sally Herbert, Brian Wright, Jacqueline Norrie, Laura Melhuish – Violin
Marcus Holdaway – Cello
Pete Fowler – Artwork
Pete James – Artwork, Art Direction and Photography

Charts

References

2007 albums
Gruff Rhys albums
Rough Trade Records albums
Team Love Records albums
Welsh-language albums
Albums produced by Gorwel Owen
Albums produced by Mario Caldato Jr.
Albums with cover art by Pete Fowler